Onychoatrophy is a faulty underdevelopment of the nail that may be congenital or acquired, in which the nail is thinned and smaller.

References

Conditions of the skin appendages